Mermaid, released in 2000, is a television movie based on the real-life story of Desiree Leanne Gill as she learns to accept her father's death. It aired originally on Showtime, and it was released on DVD in 2001. Jodelle Ferland and Ellen Burstyn were both nominated for a Daytime Emmy for Outstanding Performer in a Children's Special.

Cast 
 Ellen Burstyn - Trish
 Samantha Mathis - Rhonda
 Jodelle Ferland - Desiree Leann ("Desi") Gill
 David Kaye - Wade
 Peter Flemming - Steve
 Tom Keaton - Quaid
 Blu Mankuma - Caretaker
 Joshua Peace - Ken
 Chilton Crane - Donna
 Julia Higgs - Amanda
 Mecca Menard - Hailey

References

External links

 Mermaid, full movie on Youtube

Films directed by Peter Masterson
2000 films
Showtime (TV network) films